The Foreigner is a 1984 two-act comedy by American playwright Larry Shue. The play has become a staple of professional and amateur theatre. The Foreigner has earned two Obie Awards and two Outer Critics Circle Awards as Best New American Play and Best Off-Broadway Production.

Characters
 Charlie Baker: a meek proofreader for a science fiction magazine; he has a merrily adulterous wife whom he loves. He is witty and funny while also very smart. He is extremely shy but living at the lodge and being in contact with such wonderful people, Charlie soon comes out of his shell and eventually finds himself the center of attention as the hero. 
 S/Sgt. "Froggy" LeSueur: a cheerful British Army man who teaches the use of explosives. 
 Betty Meeks: an elderly widow who owns a resort lodge and mothers her guests. She has a fun, sarcastic nature, but she is very nurturing to all who come in contact with her. She is a hard worker, and her weak body carries all of the work she has done throughout the years. 
 Rev. David Marshall Lee: engaged to Catherine and, "it would appear, a good young man to have on our side". He comes in and out of the play and always seems like a charmer when the ladies are around. When it is just him alone with Charlie however, he begins to show his true colors.
 Catherine Simms: a pretty heiress going through an emotional time. She is kind and caring towards Ellard and quickly shows Charlie the same attention.
 Ellard Simms: Catherine's dim-witted brother, heir to half the family money if Catherine decides he is "smart enough to handle it". He is a kind, gentle-hearted man but no one really gives him the time of day until Charlie comes into the picture. Charlie not only helps Ellard become more in tune with really how bright he is, but is also taught by Ellard what it means to be patient and lighthearted.
 Owen Musser: a superstitious, dangerous racist man that lives in town.

Plot
In a resort-style fishing lodge in rural Georgia, the plot revolves around the visit of two guests, Englishmen Charlie Baker and Staff Sergeant Froggy LeSueur. Naturally shy, Charlie is also depressed because his beloved wife may be dying.

To help his friend, Froggy tells Betty Meeks, who owns the lodge, that Charlie is the native of an exotic country who does not understand a word of English. Betty, who has never traveled, is delighted to cater for a stranger who is "as foreign as the day is long." At first, Charlie is appalled by Froggy's fabrication and protests that he can't pretend.

At once, though, Charlie overhears a private and emotional conversation (Catherine discovers she is pregnant), and decides he had better perpetuate the ruse.

Before long, Charlie finds himself privy to assorted secrets and scandals freely discussed in front of him by the other visitors. These include spoiled but introspective heiress and Southern belle Catherine Simms and the man to whom she is somewhat reluctantly engaged, the Reverend David Lee, a seemingly good-natured preacher with a dark side. Her younger brother, Ellard, a somewhat "slow" boy is a simpleton who tries to "teach" Charlie how to speak English. Owen Musser, the racist county property inspector, plans to oust Betty and convert the lodge into a meeting place for the Ku Klux Klan.

When Charlie overhears David and Owen plotting the takeover by declaring the lodge buildings condemned, he spends the weekend pretending to learn a great deal of English very rapidly under the tutelage of Ellard. (He also pretends to speak his "native" language, with much repetition of the phrase "blasny, blasny" and other words that sound vaguely Russian.) Owen finds Charlie alone and threatens him, saying that when the Ku Klux Klan is in power, they will kill all the foreigners.

With the help of the trap-door to the cellar, Charlie appears to disintegrate a Klansman, and the rest run away in terror. David is unmasked, confesses all to Catherine (he was marrying her for her money), but exclaims that he can start again from scratch as long as he has the weapons in the van. Froggy appears in the doorway, arms his detonator and blows up the van. With the threat vanquished, the protagonists celebrate. Froggy takes Charlie aside to give him a telegram, saying that perhaps Charlie can remain at the lodge a little longer. Betty expects that he has received news of his wife's death. Froggy explains, "No. It was from 'is wife. No. She recovered completely. Ran off with a proctologist." Catherine urges Charlie to stay with them, and he agrees.

Performance history
Following its premiere at Milwaukee Repertory Theater, the play opened off-Broadway on November 1, 1984 at New York City's Astor Place Theatre where it ran for 686 performances. It was directed by Jerry Zaks. The opening night cast included Shue (as Froggy), Anthony Heald (Charlie), Patricia Kalember (Catherine), Robert Schenkkan (David), and Sudie Bond (Betty). The play eventually won two Obie Awards and two Outer Critics Circle Awards, including Best New American Play and Best Off-Broadway Production. Larry Shue died in a plane crash the following year, not living to see the continued popularity of The Foreigner.

On November 7, 2004, a Roundabout Theater Company revival opened for a ten-week run at the off-Broadway Laura Pels Theater. It was directed by Scott Schwartz and starred Matthew Broderick as Charlie, Frances Sternhagen as Betty, Mary Catherine Garrison as Catherine, and Neal Huff as Reverend David Marshall Lee.

In August, 2012, the American Stage Theatre Company, in Saint Petersburg, Florida, had a weeks-long run with a cast including Chris Crawford as Charlie, Natalie Symons as Catherine, Elizabeth Dimon as Betty, Gavin Hawk as the Reverend, Greyson Lewis as Ellard, and Dan Matisa as Owen. Matt Chirioni directed the production with Tom Hansen as set designer.

From September 20–October 12, 2013, it was shown in Vancouver at the Pacific Theatre.

In 2018, Fullerton Union High School in Fullerton, California, performed the play. The show was met with slight push back from the district, but was felt to be something that people needed to see. The production was given First Place in Southern California by the California Educational Theatre Association as well as Best Play by the Orange County Chapter of The Cappies.

Roosevelt High School attempted to perform the play in 2019, but it was deemed culturally insensitive by the Sioux Falls School District due to high school students dressed in Ku Klux Klan garb.

A production of The Foreigner by the theatre department of Washington College was scheduled to run from November 8–9, 2019, but it was cancelled amid concerns that "the play’s depictions of Ku Klux Klan villains 'in white hoods and robes' were 'deeply upsetting to some.'"

From October 31–November 2, 2019, Coeur d'Alene Charter Academy in Idaho did four performances of The Foreigner.

Critical response
Frank Rich saw the opening night performance at the Astor in New York. He praised the performance of Anthony Heald as Charlie and wrote that the play "desperately wants to provide some silly fun," but judged that "its convoluted shenanigans hardly seem worth the effort."

Reviewing the Roundabout Theatre Company performance for The Hartford Courant, Malcolm Johnson wrote,

Ben Brantley, reviewing the same performance for The New York Times, described it as a "deliberately doltish comedy of improbabilities." Brantley praised the star: "Mr. Broderick floats toward that rarefied ether where slapstick and ballet blur. This actor's delight in cutting loose infectiously mirrors his character's liberation from his stodgy self." However, he thought the pacing too slow and the script "as patronizing to its Southern characters as they initially are to Charlie."

Philip Brandes reviewed a 1993 production of the play, starring Steve Vinovich, Julianna McCarthy, Matthew Walker and Scott Jaeck, for the Los Angeles Times.

Marty Clear, writing for the Tampa Bay Times about a 2012 production, said,

Chicago Theater Beat called the play "a charming comedy about the magic of kindness", and DC Theater Scene described a performance by the Bay Theatre in Annapolis, Maryland, as "a hit! ... culminating in a hilarious climax and heart-warming ending."

Trivia
 Charlie speaks the phrase Klaatu barada nikto twice in the play and uses Gort, the robot's name, referring to the famous line in the classic film The Day the Earth Stood Still (1951) and his own self-stated job as an editor of science fiction.

References

External links

 
 
 
 The Foreigner (Play) Plot & Characters at StageAgent (archive)

1984 plays
American plays
Plays set in Georgia (U.S. state)
Obie Award-winning plays
Off-Broadway plays